The Caledonian Railway 191 Class were 4-6-0 passenger engines designed by William Pickersgill and built in 1922 by the North British Locomotive Company.  The class was intended for use on the Callander and Oban line, to augment the 55 Class 4-6-0s and replace elderly 179 Class 4-4-0s, and they were thus known as the New Oban Bogies, however, they were also used on other Caledonian lines.

Reputation
The locomotives were not completely successful, having a reputation for being short of steam unless skilfully fired, and the dubious distinction of the highest total locomotive hammerblow of any locomotive class inherited by the LMS upon its formation in 1923. The lack of superheating was a curious omission from a type introduced as late as 1922. This may not have helped their steaming problems.

Disposal
All were withdrawn and scrapped between 1939 and 1945, having been displaced by new Black Five 4-6-0s under the LMS's drive for standardisation.

References

191
4-6-0 locomotives
NBL locomotives
Railway locomotives introduced in 1922
Scrapped locomotives